

Modern pagan ( Neopagan) views on LGBT people vary considerably among different paths, sects, and belief systems. LGBT individuals comprise a much larger percentage of the population in neopagan circles than larger, mainstream religious populations. There are some popular neopagan traditions which have beliefs often in conflict with the LGBT community, and there are also traditions accepting of, created by, or led by LGBT individuals. The majority of conflicts concern heteronormativity and cisnormativity.

Community demographics

Orientation 

A 2003 survey by Helen A. Berger and her colleagues found 28.3% of American neopagans identified in survey as gay, lesbian, or bisexual.

In 2013, a survey of neopagans in England, Wales, Canada, Australia, and New Zealand found 49.8% of women and 44.5% of men identified as non-heterosexual. Of the non-heterosexual female demographic, 78.5% of identified as bisexual and 11.2% identified as lesbian/gay; of the non-heterosexual male demographic, 55.2% identified as gay and 37.1% identified as bisexual.

A 2015 study survey by Pew Research Center found that 11% of lesbian, gay, and bisexual respondents identified with non-Christian faiths, a large portion of which being some form of neopaganism or interfaith universalist beliefs. This was nearly double the general population.

Gender 

While the Western neopagan community is gender-diverse as a whole, the demographics tend toward female plurality or dominance in terms of numbers. The aforementioned 2013 scientific survey of Western neopagans found that women were not only the dominant neopagan demographic, but the proportion thereof was increasing across the board in many countries surveyed. However, men tended to dominate certain traditions like Norse Heathenry, Druidry, Neo-Shamanism, Ceremonial Magic, and Thelema.

Historical gender context 

The concept of "the witch" varies significantly among cultures, societies, belief systems, power structures, time periods, and other sociological factors. However, in Western culture witches are predominantly thought of as female. This is reflected in statistical analysis of historical documents showing that typically those prosecuted for witchcraft were women on average about 70 to 80 percent of the time, most of the time women over the age of 50. Actual practitioners of witchcraft in the general population varied historically. Like today, men were more likely to practice certain disciplines, an example of such being white magic in pre-modern England.

The Malleus Maleficarum (1486), one of the most notable and infamous texts concerning witchcraft, specifically postulated that women were more predisposed or likely to engage in witchcraft and paganism than men, and thus most witches were women. Jean Bodin (a 16th Century French demonologist) is noted to have claimed women are fifty-times more likely to engage in witchcraft.

General philosophical and theological issues

Gender dualism, essentialism, and sexual orientation 
Ideological issues that affect LGBTQ perception and interaction within the modern pagan community often stem from a traditionally dualistic cosmology, a view which focuses on two overarching and often oppositional categories. In modern paganism, this is traditionally seen surrounding sexuality, particularly heterosexuality, based on a gender binary which is assigned via genitalia at birth (in other words, gender essentialism.)
Binary gender essentialism is highly present in neopagan communities and their respective theological/philosophical belief systems. Pagan sources themselves, such as the Pagan Federation of the U.K., express similar views. The basis of the difference is commonly reflected in discussion about spiritual energy, which is traditionally believed to be intrinsically masculine or feminine in type and inherently possessed by those born into either binary gender.

A preeminent example of this belief is the duotheistic veneration of a God-Goddess pairing, often the Triple Goddess and Horned God, a pairing used by Wiccans. The Goddess (representing the feminine) is traditionally seen as receptive, fertile, nurturing, and passive (cast as the Moon), while the God (representing the masculine) as impregnative, a hunter, and active/aggressive (cast as the Sun). Janet Farrar, a notable Wiccan priestess and author, described this as an adoption of yin and yang in Western pagan practice.

This dual-gender archetype is traditionally regarded in a heterosexual manner, a belief which is reflected in the theology of many neopagan belief systems as well as practices such as magic and spellcraft, which traditional sects require heterosexual-based dynamics to perform. This can be a struggle for LGBTQ pagans who find the exemplified duality not reflective of their own feelings and desires.

The liturgy of the deity pair is often associated in essentialist ways. The Triple Goddess is associated with the reproductive development and cessation of cisgender woman in her three aspects Maiden, Mother, and Crone. Beginning life, the Maiden (young woman) represents virginal preadolescence. Upon menarche, the woman comes of age and transforms into the Mother (adult woman) aspect, now ostensibly capable of reproduction. Upon menopause, the woman loses her reproductive capacity she once carried, transforming into the Crone (mature woman) aspect. The Moon is believed to represent the menstrual cycle and many pagans believe the two are linked. Likewise, The Horned God is associated with the reproductive capability of cisgender men. Phallic symbology, such as the eponymous horns, represent the penis and the associated reproductive function.

Recent historical views on sexuality and gender
In the mid-20th century dawn of Neopaganism, heterosexual dualism was most exemplified in the "Great Rite" of British Traditional Wicca, one of the first notable neopagan ideological groups. In this Rite, a priest and priestess "were cast into rigidly gendered, heteronormative roles" in which the pairing performed a symbolic or literal representation of heterosexual intercourse which was considered vital for venerating supernatural entities and performing magic. It is notable that early neopagan views on sex were radical for their time in their sex positivity and tacit acceptance of BDSM.

Later in the 20th Century, as Wicca spread to North America, it incorporated countercultural, second-wave feminist, and LGBTQ elements. The essentialist rigidity fluctuated under the influence of Carl Jung's notions of anima and animus and non-heterosexual orientations became more acceptable. By the 1980s and 1990s, figures like Vivianne Crowley and Starhawk continued the evolving beliefs. Crowley associated the Jungian binary with classical elements possessed by all—the feminine/anima with water and the masculine/animus with fire. Starhawk, espousing views similar to Crowley in her 1979 edition of her seminal book The Spiral Dance, began calling into question the masculine-feminine divisions entirely by the 1999 edition, and instead focusing on traits instead of gender archetypes.

At the dawn of the 21st century, queer neopagans and their sects began to assert themselves more publicly. These LGBTQ-aligned groups "challenged the gender essentialism remaining in the sexual polarity still practiced" which remained in certain Wicca and feminist neopagan enclaves. Greater exploration and acceptance of queer and transgender figures began not only for adherents but deities and mythological figures as well. In addition, sex positivity and BDSM were brought back into active exploration and acceptance.

Issues in specific sects, paths, and traditions

Wicca 

Wiccan traditions hold a wide range of differing beliefs about sexual orientation and gender identity. However, Wicca is regarded by many practitioners as a fertility religion. Starhawk wrote in her 1982 book Dreaming the Dark, "Sexuality was a sacrament in the Old Religion; it was (and is) viewed as a powerful force through which the healing, fructifying love of the immanent Goddess was directly known, and could be drawn down to nourish the world, to quicken fertility in human beings and in nature".

Most Wiccans worship the Triple Goddess and Horned God. Prof. Melissa Harrington, writing about sexuality and Wicca, noted the Goddess and God themselves, along with the Wheel of the Year that venerates them, are a "predominantly heterosexual model", also specifying that sexual activity is typically sacramental to Wiccans.

Furthermore, a central part of Wiccan liturgy involves the Great Rite, an act of actual or symbolic ritual sexual intercourse between the two deities. This is traditionally carried out by a priest and priestess who have had the deities invoked upon them, and the conventional practice appears to be exclusively heterosexual. When performed 'in token' this involves the athame (representing the penis) descending into the chalice (representing the vagina).

Gardnerian and Alexandrian groups typically form their covens from male-female pairs exclusively. Kraemer writes, "The British Traditional Wicca of the 1950s and 1960s saw masculine and feminine energies as wholly distinct from each other, yet complementary. Although masculinity and femininity were to be valued equally, priestesses and priests were cast into rigidly gendered, heteronormative roles."

Gardnerian

Gerald Gardner, the eponymous founder of Gardnerian Wicca, particularly stressed heterosexual approaches to Wicca. This practice may stem from Gardner's text (ostensibly quoting a witch, but perhaps in his own words):

Gardner was accused of homophobia by Lois Bourne, one of the High Priestesses of the Bricket Wood coven:"Gerald was homophobic. He had a deep hatred and detestation of homosexuality, which he regarded as a disgusting perversion and a flagrant transgression of natural law... 'There are no homosexual witches, and it is not possible to be a homosexual and a witch' Gerald almost shouted. No one argued with him."
However, the legitimacy of Gardner's rumored homophobia is disputable because Gardner showed much more evidence of an open and accepting attitude about practices in his writing which would not be characterized by the hatred or phobia which was common in the 1950s:
"Also, though the witch ideal is to form perfect couples of people ideally suited to each other, nowadays this is not always possible; the right couples go together and the rest go singly and do as they can. Witchcraft today is largely a case of 'make do'."

Alexandrian

Alex Sanders, the co-founder of Gardnerian offshoot Alexandrian Wicca, came out as bisexual later in life and created new rituals in which sexual orientation was irrelevant. However, a significant portion of Alexandrian belief is regarding heterosexual reproduction, best expressed by his wife and co-founder Maxine Sanders who is well known to emphasize the concept of male-female polarity and the fact that Alexandrian Wicca is a fertility religion. She also expressed concern about a proper functionality of transgender people (referred to as "transvestites") within coven practices, saying it best to look at other traditions that suit them more. "These people", as she is noted to have said, "they're not happy people."

Feminist/Goddess Wicca 

In the 1970s, second-wave feminism and modern paganism surged forth simultaneously. Wicca paths which spawned in this time period are most notably the Reclaiming and Dianic traditions. Zsuzsanna Budapest, creator of Dianic Wicca, founded the path as a female-only, Goddess veneration tradition, while modern derivative sects may not exclude based on gender. During this time, heterosexual and lesbian feminists got into conflicts as well.

Incompatibilities between Z Budapest Dianic tradition and transgender pagans most notably reverberated across the US pagan community following the PantheaCon 2011 incident, of which there are accounts which vary depending on ideological and theological faction, in which two Dianic covens held rituals (a misogyny-healing ritual focusing on Lilith led by the Amazon Priestess Tribe and a skyclad ritual for sexual assault victims to heal from their trauma hosted by the Come-As-You-Are (CAYA) Coven) in which trans women were allegedly excluded, removed, or ostracized.

In 2012, the year after the event, the Amazon Priestess Tribe "retired" itself from specifically Z Budapest Dianic tradition, the CAYA Coven began hosting inclusive rituals and began ordaining Priests (men) and Priestxs (non-binary), and PantheaCon itself began mandating concurrent inclusive rituals for any exclusive ones.

Maintaining her position, Budapest has since fallen from grace for much of the US pagan community, and modern trans-accepting Dianics (not following Budapest's traditional liturgy) struggle to escape the shadow of the tradition's founder. Dianics as a whole are often now viewed as trans exclusionary radical feminists where they used to be considered progressive.

Heathenry 
Heathenry, neopaganism drawing from historical Scandinavian (Norse) and Germanic pagan beliefs, typically is more ideologically conservative than most neopagan traditions when it comes to gender roles. Certain heathen organizations, such as The Troth and Declaration 127, have specifically denounced many of these views. A 2015 survey revealed a greater number of heathens subscribed to universalist ideas than ethnicity-based ones.

Norse-specific 
The practice of seiðr, a Norse type of shamanic sorcery, is traditionally regarded as a women-only magical practice, requiring an openness that draws parallels to the sexually receptive feminine role found in other neopagan beliefs. Non-female practitioners are sometimes targeted with homophobic or effeminate harassment, specifically an accusation of ergi, a weak or emasculate state A notable non-female example of seiðr can be found in the Icelandic sagas, by the patriarch-god Odin. In the Ynglinga saga (c.1225), written by Icelandic poet Snorri Sturluson, it is stated that seiðr had originally been a practice among the Vanir, but that Freyja introduced it to the Æsir when she joined them. Based on this, universalist practitioners consider gender-based limitations on seiðr a prejudicial practice which subverts aspects of Norse liturgy.

Racial paganism 

Germanic occultism and neopaganism emerged in the early 20th Century and became influential, with beliefs such as Ariosophy, combining with the far-right Völkisch movement which eventually culminated in Nazism. Post-WWII continuations of similar beliefs have given rise to the Wotansvolk, a white nationalist neopagan movement, in the late 20th Century.

Modern white supremacism and Neo-Nazism with all the racist, antisemitic, and anti-LGBTQ beliefs of those ideologies have either continued, infiltrated, and co-opted many Germanic and Norse Heathen traditions such as Ásatrú (sometimes called Odinism). These groups believe that these Norse-Germanic beliefs form the true Caucasian-European ethnoreligious group.

In his 1997 manifesto Vargsmål, Norwegian metal musician and racial pagan Varg Vikernes, claimed homosexuality a type of "spiritual " that results from men "develop[ing] womanly instincts" and women "who think they are men", but regarded female bisexuality as "natural" provided it doesn't reject attraction to men. In 2005, Vikernes claimed on his personal website that "you cannot be Pagan and homosexual or even tolerate homosexuality."

Inclusive paths and traditions

Wicca 
Newer Wiccan traditions often avoid or disregard the historical aversion to LGBTQ individuals. Oboler notes the change in neopagan culture thus, "Although the symbolic bedrock of Wicca and modern Paganism is strongly gender-essentialist, the Pagan community, like the culture as a whole, has been moving away from that position." These traditions sometimes cite the Wiccan Charge of the Goddess which says "All acts of Love and Pleasure are My rituals". Professor Melissa Harrington wrote that despite traditional Wicca showing heterosexism "as Wicca has grown and attracted gay practitioners they have begun to work out ways in which Wiccan rites can become more meaningful to them".

According to professor and Wicca author Ann-Marie Gallagher, "There is a moralistic doctrine or dogma other than the advice offered in the Wiccan Rede... The only 'law' here is love... It matters that we are gay, straight, bisexual or transgender– the physical world is sacred, and [we are] celebrating our physicality, sexuality, human nature and celebrating the Goddess, Giver of ALL life and soul of ALL nature."

The Pagan Federation of Canada stated, "Over the last few decades, many people have thought that the emphasis on male/female polarity in Wicca excludes homosexuals."  However, the Federation goes on to make the case for the validity of LGBTQ orientations even within traditional Wicca, suggesting that gay men and lesbians are likely to be particularly alive to the interplay of the masculine and feminine principles in the Universe.

The adoption of horn symbology by non-men shown at certain pagan events, such as Mary Jo Neitz witnessed at Dragonfest in the 1990s, may indicate increasing acceptance of gender fluidity and sexual diversity.

Queer-specific paths

Feri 

The Feri Tradition, a modern form of traditional witchcraft has provided a home for many neopagan LGBTQ individuals. The Tradition is very open to non-heterosexual orientations and queer identities. Feri practitioner Storm Faerywolf writes:"As any Queer practitioner can attest, there is a definite shortage of Queer-specific models that encourage the strengthening of ourselves as whole beings. In many Neo-Pagan Witchcraft traditions, we are told simply to adopt the pre-existing (and heterosexist) magickal modalities of polarity and fertility. In the Feri tradition we are given certain tools that enable us to have healthier relationships with our Divine natures, devoid of any such baggage."

Minoan 
Two Minoan traditions were founded in New York City in the 1970s. Minoan initiations and elevations are all conducted in single-gender circles. Both traditions continue to this day as oath-bound, initiatory mystery religions using a ritual framework descended from Gardnerian Wicca.

Minoan Brotherhood founded in 1975 by Edmund Buczynski, an elder in the Gardnerian, WICA, and New York Welsh Traditions, in order to create a tradition for gay and bisexual men—one that would celebrate and explore the distinctive mysteries unique to men who love men.
Minoan Sisterhood founded in 1976 by Lady Rhea and Lady Miw-Sekhmet, in collaboration with Buczynski, as the women's counterpart to the Brotherhood.

Phoenix 
The Fellowship of the Phoenix (originally "Brotherhood") was founded in the summer of 2004 by seven gay men from diverse traditions such as ceremonial magic, shamanism, and pre-Gardnerian witchcraft in order to create an ecumenical neopagan tradition which serves the community of men who love men. The maxim of the Fellowship is "Find the Divine within your own experience." In 2017, the Seattle Temple began a reformation within the group to expand the tradition to be "open to all queer/LBGTQIA adults" which has been accepted throughout. Fellowship theology has been modified to fit an expanded, inclusive model.

Radical Faeries

The Radical Faeries began in the 1970s as a predominantly gay male-oriented movement. The Faeries today are a loosely affiliated worldwide network and countercultural movement seeking to redefine queer consciousness through secular spirituality; the movement also adopts elements from anarchism and environmentalism. Certain events may be focused on gay male spirituality, while others are open to all genders and orientations.

Secular, interfaith, and intersectional

Naturalist, scientific, and humanist 

Scientific pantheists and humanist or atheopagans, as well as others who practice forms of religious naturalism, frequently foster LGBTQ+ inclusion and combat historic bigotries.

Unitarian Universalism 

The Unitarian Universalist Association (UUA) states "we not only open our doors to people of all sexual orientations and gender identities, we value diversity of sexuality and gender and see it as a spiritual gift". The Covenant of Unitarian Universalist Pagans (CUUPS), the pagan-aligned affiliate of the UUA, echoes those beliefs with bylaws that state covenant membership "shall be open, without regard to race, color, sex, affectional or sexual orientation, gender expression, physical disability, national origin, or social condition."

See also 

Haitian Vodou and sexual orientation
Homosexuality and religion
LGBTQ themes in mythology
Religion and LGBTQ people
Religion and sexuality
Transgender people and religion

Notes

Bibliography

References

External links 
Divinity Beyond the Gender Binary

Modern paganism and society
LGBT and religion
Modern pagan beliefs and practices
Wicca